Naalai Manithan is a 1989 Tamil-language science fiction action horror film written and directed by Velu Prabhakaran, and produced by Thakkali Srinivasan. It stars Ajay Rathnam playing the titular role with Prabhu, Amala and Jaishankar playing the protagonist roles. The film was inspired from the American film Silent Rage directed by Michael Miller. The film was remade in Kannada as Manava 2022.

Plot 
In 2008 in Chennai, a doctor invents a drug which gives back life to the dead if injected within two hours of death. He works along with two other doctors. They experiment on the dead body of an orphan and succeed. Unknown to them, the drug induces side effects which makes the recipient immortal and, at the same time, feral and murderous. The orphan goes on a killing spree, and the city is soon flooded with murders. But he does not hurt the doctors as he trusts them, and returns to them every time he is wounded by bullets fired by the police.

A police officer starts investigating the crimes and is soon on the trail of the orphan and the doctors after suspecting their research work. When the doctor' assistants suggest to their superior that they kill the orphan to end to the rampage, the orphan overhears it and later tracks down the assistants and kills them all. Later he kills the doctor as well.

The police officer and his girlfriend finally track down the orphan, and after some intense bloodshed and fight, they roll him off a cliff in their car. Even after getting burnt, he comes back alive and attacks them. Finally, the police officer throws him into a deep watery pit, seemingly killing him, and leaves the place along with his girlfriend. However, the orphan comes out from the pit, having survived.

Cast 
 Prabhu as the police officer
 Amala as Prabhu's girlfriend
 Ajay Rathnam as immortal john
 Jaishankar as the doctor
 Thakkali Srinivasan as the doctor's assistant
 Jayashree as Thakkali Srinivasan's wife
Janagaraj  as Sergeant Sekar
Disco Shanti as Dancer
J Livingston as TV Presenter guest appearance
Senthamarai (Guest appearance) as Amala's Father
 Mohan as Host (Guest appearance)
 Jai Ganesh as Ramesh, another assistant of Jaishankar

Production 
Naalai Manithan marked the directorial debut of Velu Prabhakaran, who also wrote the screenplay and served as cinematographer. Thakkali Srinivasan produced the film and also acted. Ajay Rathnam made his acting debut with this film.

Soundtrack 
Music was by Premi–Srini, with lyrics by Muthu Bharathi. The background music and re-recording was by Manachanallur Giridharan.

Release and reception 
Naalai Manithan was released on 14 January 1989. N. Krishnaswamy of The Indian Express wrote on 20 January 1989, "The murderous hunt is what the film is about and such sequences are put together with crisp finesse. 2008 notwithstanding, Naalai Manithan is closer to what Cain did to Abel." P. S. S. of Kalki wrote .

Sequel 
The sequel Adhisaya Manithan was released in 1990, and was also directed by Prabhakaran.

References

External links 
 
1980s science fiction action films
1980s science fiction horror films
1980s serial killer films
1980s Tamil-language films
1989 directorial debut films
1989 films
Films directed by Velu Prabhakaran
Films set in Chennai
Indian action horror films
Indian remakes of American films
Indian science fiction action films
Indian science fiction horror films
Indian serial killer films
Mad scientist films
1980s action horror films